The allied army, number 29,500 men, laid siege to Tosan near Ulsan in late October. The fortress was too heavily fortified to attempt an assault, however a series of engagements did occur around the area, resulting in more than 2,000 Japanese casualties. Allied forces lifted the siege on 2 November. Katō Kiyomasa's men departed for Japan on 14 December 1598.

Citations

Bibliography

 
 
 
 
  
 
 
 
 

1597 in Asia
1598 in Asia
Conflicts in 1598
Ulsan
Ulsan
Battles of the Japanese invasions of Korea (1592–1598)